Idaho Legislative District 23 is one of 35 districts of the Idaho Legislature. It is currently represented by Senator Bert Brackett, Republican  of Rogerson, Representative Christy Zito, Republican of  Hammett, and Representative Megan Blanksma, Republican of Hammett.

District profile (1992–2002) 
From 1992 to 2002, District 23 consisted of a portion of Twin Falls.

District profile (2002–2012) 
From 2002 to 2012, District 23 consisted of Owyhee County and a portion of Twin Falls County.

District profile (2012–2022) 
District 23 currently consists of Elmore and Owyhee Counties and a portion of Twin Falls County.

District profile (2022–) 
Beginning in December 2022, District 23 will consist of Owyhee County and a portion of Ada and Canyon Counties.

See also

 List of Idaho Senators
 List of Idaho State Representatives

References

External links
Idaho Legislative District Map (with members)
Idaho Legislature (official site)

23
Elmore County, Idaho
Owyhee County, Idaho
Twin Falls County, Idaho